The 40th National Hockey League All-Star Game was held at Northlands Coliseum in Edmonton, home to the Edmonton Oilers, on February 7, 1989.

The return of Wayne Gretzky 
The previous year saw the then-unthinkable trade of Wayne Gretzky to the Los Angeles Kings, a move that shocked many Canadians, but allowed the NHL to expand into new American markets. As Gretzky was a no-brainer to be a starter due to the fan-balloting process, the game was highly touted as Gretzky's return to Edmonton (despite the Kings having faced the Oilers in Edmonton earlier in the season). To this extent, even Campbell conference coach Glen Sather reserved Gretzky's old stall in the Oilers' dressing room, and he played on the line with then-current linemate Luc Robitaille and former linemate Jari Kurri. Gretzky was warmly welcomed in Edmonton, and for his part, scored a goal and two assists and earning the ceremonial car as the game's MVP (which he promptly gave to friend and former linemate Dave Semenko).

Gretzky himself arrived in Edmonton a week early, with wife Janet and seven-week-old daughter Paulina to test drive two snowmobiles that he had bought before being traded. In comparison, Mario Lemieux, who was perennially being compared to Gretzky, had only a single assist and was a -4 in plus/minus ranking. What was interesting, however, was that Lemieux, who was on pace to shatter Gretzky's record of 215 points, was the star in the previous year's game and would be the star in next year's game.

Uniforms 
Following Rendez-Vous '87, the NHL had removed the conference names from its All-Star uniforms for the 1988 All-Star Game. The league made further changes to the uniforms this year, changing the primary color of the dark jersey from orange to black, with the contrasting shoulder and sleeve stripe in white, while the white jersey's shoulders were changed to black, and the separating stripe on both uniforms was widened and changed to orange. Orange stripes were placed above and below the band of stars at the waistline, which was reduced from six stars on each side to five. The stars were also removed from the sleeves, although the All-Star shield and individual game patch continued to be used on the shoulders. The numerals were colored orange with a contrasting outline. The corresponding pants would remain the same, while the stripes on the socks were altered to correspond to the stripe and star patterns on the respective jerseys.

The uniforms would continue to be used through 1993, with the exception of the 1992 game, which featured throwback uniforms.

Team rosters

Game summary

Referee: Ron Hoggarth
Linesmen: Ron Asselstine, Wayne Bonney
TV: CBC, SRC, SCA

See also
1988–89 NHL season

Notes 
 Mats Naslund named to Wales team, but did not play
 Denis Savard named to Campbell team, but did not play
Pre-game entertainment featured a performance by the Ukrainian Shumka Dancers

References

 

All-Star Game
National Hockey League All-Star Games
Ice hockey competitions in Edmonton